Pen Pumlumon Arwystli is the second highest summit on the Plynlimon massif, a part of the Cambrian Mountains in the county of Ceredigion, Wales.

The summit is grassy, and is marked by 3 large ancient cairns. The views include Rhos Fawr, Drygarn Fawr, Pen y Garn to the south and Aran Fawddwy, Glasgwm, Tarrenhendre and Tarren y Gesail to the north.

The longest river in Britain, the River Severn, has its source on a lower boggy plateau to the north of the summit.

See also
 Arwystli

References

External links
 www.geograph.co.uk ; photos of Plynlimon and surrounding area

Mountains and hills of Ceredigion
Hewitts of Wales
Nuttalls
Mountains and hills of Powys
Elenydd